Ivan Dodig and Filip Polášek were the defending champions but lost in the first round to Pablo Carreño Busta and Alex de Minaur.

Carreño Busta and de Minaur went on to win the title, defeating Jamie Murray and Neal Skupski in the final, 6–2, 7–5.

Seeds

Draw

Finals

Top half

Bottom half

References
Main draw

Western & Southern Open Doubles
Men's Doubles